John Roger Shankly Hynd (2 February 194218 February 2017) was a Scottish professional footballer who played as a centre half.

He started his playing career at Rangers, for whom he played in the 1967 European Cup Winners' Cup Final, before moving to the English Football League. He played nearly 300 League matches for Crystal Palace, Birmingham Citywith whom he played more than 200 games and was named Player of the Year as they won promotion to the First Division in 1972Oxford United and Walsall. He had a brief spell as manager of Motherwell and a six-game spell as interim manager of St Johnstone before leaving professional football to work as a PE teacher. He was the nephew of Bill Shankly.

In 2012, Hynd was one of seven former players elected to Birmingham City's Hall of Fame. He died in February 2017, aged 75.

Honours
Rangers
 European Cup Winners' Cup runners-up: 1966–67
Birmingham City
 Football League Second Division runners-up: 1971–72

Individual
 Birmingham City F.C. Hall of Fame: inducted 2012

References

1942 births
2017 deaths
Footballers from Falkirk
Scottish footballers
Association football central defenders
Rangers F.C. players
Crystal Palace F.C. players
Birmingham City F.C. players
Oxford United F.C. players
Walsall F.C. players
Scottish Football League players
English Football League players
Scottish football managers
Motherwell F.C. managers
St Johnstone F.C. managers
Scottish Football League managers